Cambodia competed at the 2019 World Championships in Athletics in Doha, Qatar, 4–13 August 2019.

Results
(q – qualified, NM – no mark, SB – season best)

Men 

Track and road events

References

Nations at the 2019 World Athletics Championships
World Championships in Athletics
Cambodia at the World Championships in Athletics